This is the discography of English beat group the Tremeloes, including with Brian Poole.

Albums

Studio albums

Live albums

Compilation albums

EPs

Singles

Notes

References

Discographies of British artists
Pop music group discographies
Rock music group discographies